Leo Durocher returned as manager of the Brooklyn Dodgers to start the 1948 season but was fired in mid-season. He was replaced first by team coach Ray Blades and then by Burt Shotton, who had managed the team to the 1947 pennant. The Dodgers finished third in the National League after this tumultuous season.

The 1948 Dodgers were very much a work in progress, beginning to coalesce into the classic "Boys of Summer" teams of the 1950s. Gil Hodges was in the opening day lineup, but as a catcher. He would only be shifted to first base after the emergence of Roy Campanella. Jackie Robinson started the season at second base—Eddie Stanky had been traded just before the start of the season to make room for Robinson at his natural position; he had played first base during his 1947 rookie season. Pee Wee Reese was the only "Boys of summer" regular to already be ensconced at his position, shortstop. Billy Cox had been acquired from the Pittsburgh Pirates during the offseason, but as one of nine players who would see time at third for the team that year, he only played 70 games at the position. Carl Furillo was already a regular, but in center field. Duke Snider was brought up to the team in mid-season, and it was not until 1949 that Furillo moved to right field and Snider became the regular center fielder.

Preacher Roe and Ralph Branca were in the starting rotation, but Carl Erskine only appeared in a handful of games, and Don Newcombe would not join the staff until the following year.

Offseason
 November 14, 1947: Stan Rojek and Ed Stevens were purchased from the Dodgers by the Pittsburgh Pirates.
 December 3, 1947: Monty Basgall was traded by the Dodgers to the Pittsburgh Pirates for Jimmy Bloodworth and Vic Barnhart.
 December 8, 1947: Dixie Walker, Hal Gregg and Vic Lombardi were traded by the Dodgers to the Pittsburgh Pirates for Preacher Roe, Billy Cox and Gene Mauch.
 March 6, 1948: Eddie Stanky was traded by the Dodgers to the Boston Braves for Bama Rowell, Ray Sanders and cash.

Regular season
Future Hall of Famer Roy Campanella made his major league debut on April 20. In July, Campanella replaced Bruce Edwards as the club's starting catcher. This marked the first time that a major league team had two black players in its everyday lineup.

On September 9, Rex Barney pitched a no-hitter against the New York Giants. He walked two batters and struck out four in a 2–0 victory.

Season standings

Record vs. opponents

Opening Day lineup

Notable transactions
 April 18, 1948: Ray Sanders was purchased from the Dodgers by the Boston Braves.
 September 29, 1948: Jimmy Bloodworth was purchased from the Dodgers by the Cincinnati Reds.

Roster

Player stats

Batting

Starters by position
Note: Pos = Position; G = Games played; AB = At bats; H = Hits; Avg.= Batting average; HR = Home runs; RBI = Runs batted in

Other batters
Note: G = Games played; AB = At bats; H = Hits; Avg.= Batting average; HR = Home runs; RBI = Runs batted in

Pitching

Starting pitchers
Note: G = Games pitched; IP = Innings pitched; W = Wins; L = Losses; ERA = Earned run average; SO = Strikeouts

Other pitchers
Note: G = Games pitched; IP = Innings pitched; W = Wins; L = Losses; ERA = Earned run average; SO = Strikeouts

Relief pitchers
Note: G = Games pitched; W = Wins; L = Losses; SV = Saves; ERA = Earned run average; SO = Strikeouts

Awards and honors
1948 Major League Baseball All-Star Game
Ralph Branca starter
Pee Wee Reese starter

League top five finishers
Rex Barney
 #2 in NL in strikeouts (138)
 #4 in NL in shutouts (4)

Ralph Branca
 #5 in NL in strikeouts (122)

Pee Wee Reese
 #2 in NL in stolen bases (25)

Jackie Robinson
 #4 in NL in runs scored (108)
 #4 in NL in stolen bases (22)
 #4 in NL in doubles (38)

Preacher Roe
 #4 in NL in ERA (2.63)

Farm system

LEAGUE CHAMPIONS: Montreal, St. Paul, Ft. Worth, Greenville, Nashua, Newport News, Santa Barbara, Pulaski, Sheboygan, Zanesville

Notes

References
Baseball-Reference season page
Baseball Almanac season page

External links
1948 Brooklyn Dodgers uniform
Brooklyn Dodgers reference site
Acme Dodgers page 
Retrosheet

 
Los Angeles Dodgers seasons
Brooklyn Dodgers season
Jackie Robinson
1948 in sports in New York City
1940s in Brooklyn
Flatbush, Brooklyn